KIIO-LD, virtual and VHF digital channel 10, is a low-powered USArmenia-affiliated television station licensed to Los Angeles, California, United States. The station is owned by Bagrat Sargsyan and Vaagn Sarkissian.

Sister channels
Bagrat Sargsyan and Vaagn Sarkissian are also owners of USATV LLC, USArmenia television network, and former BEST TV channel. KIIO-LD formerly carried PBJ, a now-defunct classic cartoon diginet from Luken Communications.

Digital channels
The station's digital signal is multiplexed:

References

External links
KIIO website

IIO-LD